The Queen's Award for Enterprise: Innovation (Technology) (2005) was awarded on 21 April 2005, by Queen Elizabeth II.

Recipients
The following organisations were awarded this year.
AGD Systems Limited of Cheltenham, Gloucestershire for Pedestrian detection using digital vision technology.
Air Bearings Limited of Poole, Dorset for Ultra high speed air bearing PCB drilling spindles.
apetito Ltd of Trowbridge, Wiltshire for Provision of food to the elderly.
Apollo Chemicals Limited of Tamworth, Staffordshire for  'Fast-tack' solvent free contact adhesive.
Autotype International Limited of Wantage, Oxfordshire for Formable hardcoatings for use in the decoration of injection mouldings (In mould decoration).
Avent, the Baby Products Division of Cannon Avent Group Plc of Glemsford, Sudbury, Suffolk for Breast milk feeding range for working mothers.
B&W Loudspeakers Limited of Worthing, West Sussex for Tube loading to loudspeaker drive units.
Bionics Corporation Ltd, trading as Broadcast Bionics of Haywards Heath, West Sussex for PhoneBOX, TV/Radio studio telephone call routing system.
Cableflow International Limited of High Wycombe, for Buckinghamshire TECHNOTRUNK MEDISYS integra – Bedhead Services Trunking System.
Carton Edge Systems Ltd of Coventry, for the Eco-Edge TM system for applying biodegradable serrated cutting edges to kitchen foil and film cartons.
Checkprint Limited of Hinckley, Leicestershire for Software solutions in cheque handling.
Colin Stewart Minchem Ltd of Winsford, Cheshire for Research, development and production of detergent intermediates.
Corniche Fine Arts Limited of Bridlington, East Riding of for Yorkshire 'DotMatch' flexographic wet proofing.
Datix Limited of London SW19 for Risk management and patient safety software (Healthcare).
DiGiCo UK Limited of Chessington, Surrey for Design of digital mixing consoles for live applications.
FilmLight Ltd of London WC1 for Northlight – digital film scanner for the motion picture industry.
Fujitsu Telecommunications Europe Limited of Birmingham for GeoStream Access Gateway for delivering broadband services throughout the UK.
John Guest International Limited of West Drayton, Middlesex for Speedfit plastic plumbing fittings and pipe.
Inca Digital Printers Ltd of Cambridge for Industrial digital flatbed inkjet printers.
Interface Fabrics Ltd of Mirfield, West Yorkshire for design innovation in performance contract textiles.
KROHNE Ltd of Wellingborough, for Northamptonshire 'OPTIMASS' Coriolis mass flow metering of fluids for process engineering industries.
Martek Marine Ltd of Rotherham, South Yorkshire for BULKSAFE water ingress detection system for bulk carrier ships.
Norprint Labelling Systems Limited of Boston, Lincolnshire for Nortag – lightweight acousto magnetic retail security swing tag which increases product security.
Alan Nuttall Ltd – Fresh Food Solutions of Hinckley, Leicestershire for hot food display technology.
PIPS Technology Ltd of Chandler's Ford, Eastleigh, for Hampshire Spike – Integrated number plate capture and analysis.
Pipeshield International Limited of Lowestoft, SuVolk for Specialised protection and support systems for marine/oVshore structures and pipelines.
Retail Logic Ltd of Fleet, Hampshire for Smart-Solution providing retailers with an upgrade path to Chip and PIN card processing.
RiskSTOP Ltd of Dorchester, Dorset for ASSIST risk management tool.
SiS (Science in Sport) Limited of Old Langho, Blackburn for Isotonic energy gel, for use by athletes, sports people and high expenders of energy.
Safeglass (Europe) Limited of East Kilbride, Glasgow, for Scotland Safeglass> – polymer that mimics glass.
ScotAsh Limited of Kincardine-on-Forth, Fife, Scotland for re-engineering and re-use of power station ash in value-added construction products.
ScrewFast Foundations Ltd of St Albans, Hertfordshire for specialist high speed, concrete free foundation system for buildings, masts and tall structures.
Selenia Communications Limited of Chelmsford, Essex for H4855 personal role radio for use by frontline troops.
Sibelius Software Ltd of London N4 for Sibelius music notation software for writing and teaching music.
Sterling Power Products Limited of Worcester for Integrated Mobile Power Supply System.
Surrey Satellite Technology Ltd of Guildford, Surrey for highly advanced, low cost, nano-, micro- and minisatellites.
TMD Technologies Ltd of Hayes, Middlesex for ultra low noise free range power supply for Doppler radar.
TPA Trax Portable Access Limited of Worksop, Nottinghamshire for design and performance of portable roadways.
The Training Foundation Ltd of Coventry for best-practice generic training skills programme – Trainer Assessment Programme (TAP>).
Visualfiles Limited of Headingley, Leeds for design of legal case and matter management software.
Xaar plc of Cambridge for developmentof piezo-inkjet printheads.

References

Queen's Award for Enterprise: Innovation (Technology)
2005 in the United Kingdom